Santa (also known as Sanza or Samaritana) della Pietà (fl. ca. 1725 – ca. 1750, died after 1774) was an Italian singer, composer, and violinist.

A foundling admitted in infancy to the Ospedale della Pietà, della Pietà received a full grounding in music from early childhood at the coro, or music school, attached to the convent. She is known to have been a contralto soloist, violinist, and composer during the tenures of Giovanni Porta, Nicola Porpora, and Andrea Bernasconi as heads of the school. She is also known to have studied violin with Anna Maria della Pietà (also named ″Anna Maria dal violin″) and to have succeeded her as director of the school orchestra around 1740; at this time she performed at least six of the concertos written by Antonio Vivaldi for Anna Maria. One piece by Santa, a setting of the Vespers Psalm 113 in D, survives.

Along with Agata and Michielina della Pietà, della Pietà was one of three foundlings resident at the Ospedale to become a composer later in life. Nothing further is known about her.

References 
Berdes, Jane L. "Della Pietà, Santa [Sanza, Samaritana] (fl. c. 1725-c. 1750, d. after 1774)." The Norton/Grove Dictionary of Women Composers. Julie Anne Sadie and Rhian Samuel, eds. New York City; London: W. W. Norton & Company, 1995. p. 139.

Italian Baroque composers
Italian women classical composers
18th-century Venetian women
18th-century Italian composers
Year of birth uncertain
Year of death uncertain
Women classical violinists
Italian classical violinists
18th-century violinists
18th-century women composers
Musicians from Venice